Devět kruhů pekla (English: Nine Circles of Hell) is a 1988 Czechoslovak drama film directed by Milan Muchna. It was screened in the Un Certain Regard section at the 1989 Cannes Film Festival. The film describes the Khmer Rouge period in Cambodia. Tomáš is a Czech doctor working in Phnom Penh and Khema is famous Khmer actress.

Plot
Nine Circles of Hell is a tragic love story of a Czech doctor and a Cambodian woman who marry and have a child but are then separated by the Khmer Rouge regime. The young mother dies from their atrocities and the Czech doctor is sent back to Czechoslovakia. When the Khmer Rouge are driven from power, the doctor returns and is reunited with his child.

Analysis
Nine Circles of Hell is a rare witness on tape of the state of Phnom Penh in the aftermath of the Khmer Civil War. As a Czech-Cambodian romantic drama production supported by both the Department of Film of the Ministry of Culture of Kampuchea and the Czech  Nine Circles of Hell,  it belongs among those eighties co-productions that stemmed from cultural activities agreed with “friendly [communist] regimes” of the time.

One of the expert consultants, Ruy Neakong, is one of only fourteen survivors from the twenty thousand prisoners of the Tuol Sleng prison which operated in Phnom Penh between 1975 and 1979. Another expert consultant, Chheng Phon laeter became the director of the Cambodian National Conservatoire and later the Cambodian minister of culture – as he helped to educate younger representatives in the national cultural traditions because he was one of only a few students and ten teachers who had survived the Khmer genocide.

Cast
 Milan Kňažko as Tomáš
 Petr Čepek as Tomáš (voice)
 Oum Savanny as Khema
 Heng Chanrith as Dr. Rath Thong
 Ban Thavy as Thyda
 Nov Chandary as Chivan
 Khuon Chhum as Pon
 Jiří Samek as doc. Samek
 Jiří Schmitzer as Dalibor
 Jan Schmid as dr. Kubeš
 Milan Lasica as dr. Kalivoda

See also
The Killing Fields, a 1984 British film
Shadow of Darkness, a 1989 Cambodian film

References

External links
 

1988 films
1988 drama films
1980s war drama films
Czech romantic action films
Czech war drama films
1980s Czech-language films
Czechoslovak drama films
Films about the Cambodian genocide
Czech action war films
Czech romantic drama films